Finsthwaite Heights is an upland area in the English Lake District, above Finsthwaite, Cumbria. It is the subject of a chapter of Wainwright's book The Outlying Fells of Lakeland. Wainwright's walk starts from Newby Bridge, climbs through woodland passing a tower which has a 1799 inscription commemorating the Royal Navy, passes through the village, and climbs to the man-made tarns of Low Dam and High Dam. These were made to provide power for Stott Park Bobbin Mill. Wainwright says of his route: "Everywhere the surroundings are delightful. But this is not fellwalking."

References

Fells of the Lake District
Colton, Cumbria